Gypsy is the debut double album by the progressive rock band Gypsy. It was recorded at Devonshire Studios, North Hollywood, California, and released in 1970. The album was re-released in 1979 on a K-tel label named Cognito and again in 1999 on CD by Bedrock Records. "Gypsy Queen" is the band's only charted single, peaking at #64. The album peaked at #44 on the Billboard Pop Albums charts in 1970.

Reception

Writing for Allmusic, music critic Richard Foss wrote of the album "Though nothing else on Gypsy's debut album came quite up to the standard of the opening number, the whole album is enjoyable for connoisseurs of jazzy progressive rock... In retrospect, it's hard to believe that this debut didn't make a bigger splash when it was first released. Gypsy's work has held up very well compared to most albums from this era, and is still a delightful listen."

Track listing
All songs by Enrico Rosenbaum except as noted.

Side 1
 "Gypsy Queen Part I" – 4:21
 "Gypsy Queen Part II" – 2:33
 "Man of Reason" (Johnson)  – 2:59
 "Dream If You Can" (Rosenbaum, Epstein)  – 2:48
 "Late December"  – 4:12

Side 2
 "The Third Eye" (Walsh)  – 4:55
 "Decisions" – 8:16
 "I Was So Young" – 4:00

Side 3
 "Here in My Loneliness" – 3:10
 "More Time" – 5:35
 "The Vision" – 7:30

Side 4
 "Dead and Gone" – 11:07
 "Tomorrow is the Last to be Heard" – 5:48

Bonus track
A bonus track, "The Innocence", was recorded in 1999 by Walsh and Johnson and included on the Bedrock Records re-issue.

Personnel
Enrico Rosenbaum - guitar, vocals
James Walsh - keyboards, vocals
James Johnson - guitar, vocals
Jay Epstein - drums
Donnie Larson - bass
Preston Epps - percussion
Jimmie Haskell - string arrangements
James SK Wān - bamboo flute

Production notes
Produced by James Walsh, Enrico Rosenbaum, Glen Pace

Charts
Single

References

External links
 Gypsy Tribute site

1970 debut albums
Albums arranged by Jimmie Haskell
Bedrock Records albums
Gypsy (band) albums